The original that this article was based upon can be seen at :sv:Electrolux Assistent in the Swedish Wikipedia.

Assistent is a household kitchen appliance, introduced by Electrolux in 1940.

The distinctive feature of this mixer is that it spins the bowl and its contents, not the stirring paddle. As a result, there is more torque and less noise. The bowl is driven by an electric motor and worm gear from beneath. The power of the motor has increased over time from 250 W through 400 W, 450 W, 650 W, 800 W and now 1500 W. Original machines had a simple single speed switch; modern machines have both variable speed and a timer.

History 

It was designed by Alvar Lenning and became a bestseller for Electrolux. Until 1962, the Assistent was produced at Lilla Essingen in Stockholm, when the production line was then moved to Motala. Since 1969, the Assistent has been produced in Ankarsrum when Electrolux acquired the metallurgy firm Ankarsrums bruk and moved the production line to there from Motala. Originally produced in a creme colour, it is sold today in several different colours. Electrolux subsequently sold the Assistent appliance line to the investment company Traction AB in 2001, and in 2009 the now-renamed Ankarsrum Industries AB took over all rights to produce, market and sell the Assistent.
For a number of years after the war, a Danish variant was produced in Ballerup and sold as Ballerup Master Mixer. It was made by Helmuth A. Jensen A/S, and some sources say this was the original design from 1940, that Electrolux overtook.

Accessories 
A range of additional accessories are available, most of which are the typical accessories for a large mixer. Most attachments are driven using the main drive shaft used to drive the bowl, however, some – such as the meat grinder or pasta roller – require the machine to be tilted on its side.
The attachments available are:
 Meat mincer
 Vegetable grater
 Citrus press
 Pasta roller
 Coffee and grain mill
 Double beater for lighter cake mixtures.

The meat mincer also has many additional attachments, such as a sausage horn, strainer or nut grinder.

One is an unusual attachment, favoured by the Swedish market
 Flake mill
 This rolls grains such as oats and buckwheat to make muesli.

One attachment, the blender, uses a separate higher rpm drive shaft at the rear of the machine.

In the United States and Canada, the Assistent has since around 1990 been distributed with attachable scraper, roller and a dough hook in each box. There is some disagreement as to whether the dough hook is needed or not (as opposed to the scraper and roller).

References

External links 

 assistent-original.se is the Swedish-language web page for the now parent company, Ankarsrum.
 http://assistent-original.se/en/history/ is the english-language 'History page' for the product/company.
 Ankarsrum Original USA, is the US distributor for the Assistent.  Its parent company is Bread Beckers.
 Magic Mill USA.
 A three-second YouTube video of a 50-year-old model.
 The Swedish Nationalmuseum's web page (a blog entry) on the Assistent: http://www.nationalmuseum.se/sv/Skola/For-SFI-och-SAS/Projekt-Tingen-talar-till-oss/Bouchra-fran-Marocko/.
 American Electrolux – The Beginning, and the Early Years by Charles Richard Lester
 https://www.youtube.com/watch?v=5tvEz4Ko8pQ, another good YouTube video (25:24).  This one also shows the mill accessory at the beginning.
 https://www.youtube.com/playlist?list=PL38C789F0854F6573, an English language YouTube Playlist "Instructions Ankarsrum Assistent English", apparently by the Ankarsrum company.
 https://www.kunzi.it/marchi/ankarsrum, Italian market site
 https://www.kulturarv.dk.., a Ballerup Master Mixer at Ballerup Museum

Home appliance brands
Ankarsrum Assistent
Food preparation appliances